Peroxisome proliferator-activated receptor delta (PPAR-delta), or (PPAR-beta), also known as Nuclear hormone receptor 1 (NUC1) is a nuclear receptor that in humans is encoded by the PPARD gene.

This gene encodes a member of the peroxisome proliferator-activated receptor (PPAR) family. It was first identified in Xenopus in 1993.

Function
PPAR-delta is a nuclear hormone receptor that governs a variety of biological processes and may be involved in the development of several chronic diseases, including diabetes, obesity, atherosclerosis, and cancer.

In muscle PPARD expression is increased by exercise, resulting in increased oxidative (fat-burning) capacity and an increase in type I fibers. Both PPAR-delta and AMPK agonists are regarded as exercise mimetics. In adipose tissue PPAR-β/δ increases both oxidation as well as uncoupling of oxidative phosphorylation.

PPAR-delta may function as an integrator of transcription repression and nuclear receptor signaling. It activates transcription of a variety of target genes by binding to specific DNA elements. Well described target genes of PPARδ include PDK4, ANGPTL4, PLIN2, and CD36. The expression of this gene is found to be elevated in colorectal cancer cells. The elevated expression can be repressed by adenomatosis polyposis coli (APC), a tumor suppressor protein involved in the APC/beta-catenin signaling pathway. Knockout studies in mice suggested the role of this protein in myelination of the corpus callosum, epidermal cell proliferation, and glucose and lipid metabolism.

This protein has been shown to be involved in differentiation, lipid accumulation, directional sensing, polarization, and migration in keratinocytes.

Role in cancer
Studies into the role of PPAR-delta in cancer have produced contradictory results and there is no scientific consensus on whether it promotes or prevents cancer formation. PPAR-delta favours tumour angiogenesis.

Pharmacology
Several high affinity ligands for PPAR-delta have been developed, including GW501516 and GW0742, which play an important role in research. In one study utilizing such a ligand, it has been shown that agonism of PPARδ changes the body's fuel preference from glucose to lipids.

Tissue distribution 
PPAR-delta is highly expressed in many tissues, including colon, small intestine, liver and keratinocytes, as well as in heart, spleen, skeletal muscle, lung, brain and thymus.

Knockout studies
Knockout mice lacking the ligand binding domain of PPAR-delta are viable. However, these mice are smaller than the wild type both neo and postnatally. In addition, fat stores in the gonads of the mutants are smaller. The mutants also display increased epidermal hyperplasia upon induction with TPA.

Ligands
PPAR-delta is activated in the cell by various fatty acids and fatty acid derivatives. Examples of naturally occurring fatty acids that bind with and activate PPAR-delta include arachidonic acid and certain members of the 15-hydroxyicosatetraenoic acid family of arachidonic acid metabolites including 15(S)-HETE, 15(R)-HETE, and 15-HpETE. Several synthetic ligands have been identified that selectively bind PPAR-delta.

Agonists 
 GW501516
 GW0742
 Telmisartan

Interactions
Peroxisome proliferator-activated receptor delta has been shown to interact with HDAC3 and NCOR2.

References

Further reading

External links 
 

Intracellular receptors
Transcription factors
Biology of bipolar disorder